Elbit Systems Ltd. is an Israel-based international defense electronics company engaged in a wide range of programs throughout the world. The company, which includes Elbit Systems and its subsidiaries, operates in the areas of aerospace, land and naval systems, command, control, communications, computers, intelligence surveillance and reconnaissance (C4ISR), unmanned aircraft systems (UAS), advanced electro-optics, electro-optic space systems, electronic warfare suites, signal intelligence (SIGINT) systems, data links and communications systems and radios. The company also focuses on the upgrading of existing military platforms, developing new technologies for defense, homeland security and commercial aviation applications and providing a range of support services, including training and simulation systems. In 2016, Elbit Systems had approximately 13,895 employees, the majority of whom are engaged in engineering, mechanics, research and development, and other computing and technical areas. Elbit Systems' shares are traded on the Tel Aviv Stock Exchange and NASDAQ.

History

Early years – a division within Elron
Elbit Systems was founded in 1966 by Elron Electronic Industries (TASE ELRN), which combined the existing expertise within the Israel Ministry of Defense-Research Institute in special computer design with Elron's experience in electronic product design, manufacture and management (initially under the name Elbit Computers).
Elbit steadily expanded developing and producing logistic-support weapon delivery and navigation systems for most Israeli aircraft, establishing a combat avionics package for the IAI Lavi fighter aircraft, and producing a fire-control system for the Merkava tank.

1996 IPO on NASDAQ
In 1996, Elbit spun off into three independent companies:
 Elbit Medical Imaging (NASDAQ EMITF) – During 1999 to 2000 Elscint (Another affiliate of Elron) and Elbit Medical Imaging sold their imaging activities to General Electric Medical Systems and to Picker (now part of Philips Medical Systems) for approximately $600 million.
 Elbit Systems – Created as the defence electronics arm of Elbit, the company had an  initial public offering on the NASDAQ stock market with the symbol NASDAQ:ESLT and finished its first day of trading at a price of $7.75. Elbit Systems has a market cap of over $5 Billion.
 Elbit – which focused on communications activities and in 1999 led the consortium that founded Partner Communications Company, Israel's first GSM operator NASDAQ PTNR. In 2002, Elbit was merged into Elron. Elron sold its shares in Partner during 2003–2006 for approximately $160 million.

Merger with El-Op
In 2000, Elbit Systems merged with El-Op (a company controlled by the current chairman, Michael Federmann), creating the largest non governmental defense electronics company in Israel and increasing Elbit Systems' value which later in 2004, enabled Elron to sell its shares in Elbit Systems for approximately $200 million. Following the merger with El-Op, Michael Federmann became the largest shareholder in the combined group.

Growth by acquisition

Following the merger with El-Op, Michael Federmann and CEO Joseph Ackerman led an aggressive growth by acquisitions strategy.

The company acquired companies, including:
 Elisra
 Tadiran Communications
 Shiron Satellite Communications
 BVR Systems
 Assets of Israel Military Industries’ Aircraft Systems Division
 Innovative Concepts, Inc.
 Mikal Ltd (the company initially purchased 19% of the firm, and later agreed to acquire Mikal's 100% holdings in Soltam Systems and Saymar and the 87.85% portion of ITL held by Mikal, in exchange Mikal's owners received the 19% of Mikal that Elbit had purchased)  Elbit subsequently announced a cash tender offer for the 12.15% remainder of ITL held by the public.

Since 2014

In October 2014, Elbit Systems won a $12.7 million contract for the supply and provision of Apache Aviator Integrated Helmets for the US Army helicopter fleet. The contract would be delivered over a two-year period.

On March 22, 2018, Elbit Systems and Universal Avionics announced today that Elbit "is in the process of completing the acquisition of the privately owned U.S. company Universal Avionics Systems Corporation [UASC] through an asset acquisition agreement." The deal is expected to close “in the coming weeks.”

In the year of 2019, Elbit Systems purchased the night vision business of Harris Corp. (which had earlier acquired Exelis Inc., previously of ITT Inc.) for $350 million when Harris merged with L3.

In April 2019, Elbit Systems announced that it had partnered with DA-Group to produce and advertise its anti-jamming devices for global navigation satellite systems.

In August 2019, Elbit Systems won an IMOD contract to install the Iron Fist active protection system on the IDF's new Eitan AFV and the IDF's fleet of armored D9 bulldozers.

In April 2021, the Australian Army directed that Elbit's battlefield management system be withdrawn from use by 15 May. The Australian Broadcasting Corporation reported that this action was taken due to concerns about the system's security. An Australian Financial Review columnist stated that the security problems comprised "a “backdoor” security vulnerability reportedly uncovered by the Australian Signals Directorate". The Australian Defence Magazine also reported that the system had failed two security milestones during 2020. Elbit denied that the system posed any security risks.

Major subsidiaries

 Elbit Systems Intelligence and Electro-optics – Elop Ltd.
 Elbit Systems Land and C4I Ltd.
 Elbit Systems EW and SIGINT – Elisra Ltd.
 Elbit Systems – Cyclone Ltd.
 Elbit Security Systems Ltd.
 Kinetics Ltd.
 SCD – Semi-Conductor Devices
 Opgal – Optronics Industries Ltd.
 Elbit Systems of America, LLC
 Elbit Systems Land

Former holdings and spin-offs
 Elbit Vision Systems (NASDAQ EVSNF) – a developer and manufacturer of automated optical inspection solutions for textile manufacturing processes, founded in 1992 and had an initial public offering on the NASDAQ in 1996.
 Chip PC Technologies (TASE CPPC) – a developer and manufacturer of thin client solutions for server-based computing; Elbit acquired 20% of the company in 2006.
 Everysight – a developer and manufacturer of an augmented reality smartglasses for cyclists, founded in 2016.

Global presence

Europe
Azerbaijan

Belgium – On 1 July 2003, Elbit acquired OIP Sensor Systems.

France – On June 19, 2011, Elbit announced that its subsidiary Elisra Electronic Systems Ltd. was awarded a contract valued at approximately €5 million to supply hundreds of units of its AN/PRC-684 Personal Locator Beacon to the French Ministry of Defense, equipping the French Air Force, Army, Navy and DGA (Direction Générale de l'Armement). The project is to be performed within 24 months.

Italy – On June 22, 2011, Elbit announced that it was awarded a contract valued in excess of US$15 million by Elettronica S.p.A. to participate in a program to supply the ELT/572 DIRCM (Directed Infra-Red Countermeasures) system for installation on various platforms of the Italian Air Force, including the C130J, C27J and AW101. The contract is to be performed over the next three years.

North Macedonia – In February 2004 Elbit System started modernization of 4 helicopters (two transport MI-17, and two attack helicopters MI-24V) in Air Base Petrovec for Macedonian Air Force with equipment (ANVIS/HUD-24) for flight and combat in night environments. On May 11, 2011, Ministry of Defence signed a contract for building a training center for pilots with simulators (Full Mission Sumulator, FMS) for MI-17 and MI-24 helicopters. Simulators was produced by Romanian Company Simultec ownership of Elbit Systems, On March 2, 2014, centar was opened with ceremony led by President of Republic Of Macedonia Gjorge Ivanov, Premier of Republic Of Macedonia Nikola Gruevski, ex-minister from Ministry of Defence and other guests.

Romania – Elbit Systems' activities in Romania, which started in 1996, are primarily carried out through its wholly owned Romanian subsidiaries, Elbit Systeme S.A., A-E Electronics S.A, Elmet International SRL and Simultec SRL, which employ approximately 400 employees.
On May 24, 2011, Elbit announced that it was awarded a contract valued at approximately $18.6 million to upgrade the Romanian Air Forces' C-130 transport aircraft. According to the agreement, the C-130 aircraft will be installed with various types of advanced electronic systems, including those produced by Elbit Systems' wholly owned subsidiary – Elisra Electronic Systems Ltd. The project, to be performed over four years, will be executed in cooperation with local companies in Romania, led by the Romanian Aeronautical Industry.

Sweden - On June 17, 2021, Elbit Systems announced the establishment of its Swedish subsidiary "Elbit Systems Sweden". On January 13, 2022, Elbit Systems Sweden was awarded with a contract to supply combat management systems to the Royal Swedish Navy. On January 24, 2023, Elbit Systems Sweden announced that it was awarded a contract valued at approximately $48 million to equip the Swedish Armed Forces with new mobile tactical communications stations. According to the contract, Elbit Systems Sweden are to develop and deliver two Technical High Mobility Shelter (THMS) variants - RL HYTT 24A and RL HYTT 24B.

United Kingdom
Elbit Systems Uk Ltd. was incorporated on 24 September 2004, as a holding company for Elbit's activities in the United Kingdom. As of 2021, it has six subsidiary companies, located across ten sites in the country, employing over 500 people.

The company was incorporated after Elbit and Thales Group of France, won a tender (code named "Watchkeeper program") to supply the British Army with unmanned aerial vehicles. The tender condition included a requirement to set up a local manufacturing facility for the program, therefore, at the end of 2005 a joint venture company was established, with the Thales Group, named "UAV Tactical Systems Ltd (U-TacS)", based in Leicester to manufacture the Watchkeeper WK450. Additionally a flight testing facility was set up at ParcAberporth in West Wales.

In 2007, Elbit acquired Ferranti Technologies, based in Oldham, Greater Manchester, a company that was part of the historic Ferranti group and provides engineering, manufacturing and product support to the aerospace and defence markets. Starting in 2014, following the Gaza War, activists from Palestine Action and other groups started protesting outside the factory in Oldham. Eventually, in January 2022 Elbit announced that it is selling the facility.

In February 2016, Affinity Flying Services Limited, a joint venture between Elbit and Kellog, Brown and Root was awarded a £500 million contract to manage the "UK Military Flight Training System" (UKMFTS) program for the Ministry of Defence, to deliver aircrew training for over an 18-year period.

On 19 May 2021, during the 2021 Israel–Palestine crisis, four members of the Palestine Action group dressed in red boiler suits climbed onto the roof of an Elbit Systems-owned drone factory in Meridian Business Park, Leicester. The occupation lasted six days, and a total of 10 arrests were made for conspiracy to commit criminal damage and aggravated trespass. 
The group have staged similar occupations of Elbit Systems sites in Bristol, Oldham in collaboration with Extinction Rebellion and Tamworth in collaboration with Animal Rebellion.

As of 2023, Elbit closed its Oldham factory and London headquarters.

North America
United States – Elbit owns several companies in the United States through its American subsidiary, Elbit Systems of America (ESA):The elbit systems  of America operates under a Special  Security  agreement with a proxy  board, allowing it to function  independently  and separately from its parent  company.

Elbit Systems of America (ESA) is incorporated  in Delaware

EFW in Fort Worth, Texas (the EFW facility also houses ESA's home office)
EFW manufactures components for the F-16, V-22, and Bradley Fighting Vehicle, among other programs.  It was initially the electronics manufacturing facility for General Dynamics operations in Fort Worth; when GD sold its aviation business to Lockheed Martin the latter was not interested in the facility which was then sold to Elbit.
IEI in Talladega, Alabama (formerly International Enterprises, Inc.)
Kollsman Inc. in Merrimack, New Hampshire (founded in 1928 by Paul Kollsman, who invented barometers and instrument flight in airplanes)
Kollsman is a subcontractor to Boeing on SBInet, a high-tech security system for the U.S.-Mexico border in conjunction with the United States Department of Homeland Security.
Talla-Com in Tallahassee, Florida
Innovative Concepts, Inc. (ICI) in McLean, Virginia, purchased in November 2008 from Herley Industries
VSI in San Jose, California (a joint venture with Rockwell Collins, formerly known as Vision Systems International; Elbit and Rockwell Collins each own 50%)
UAS Dynamics in Fort Mill, South Carolina (originally a 50–50 joint venture with General Dynamics Armament and Technical Products; on December 1, 2011, Elbit purchased GD's 50% share)
M7 Aerospace, formerly Fairchild Dornier Aviation in San Antonio, Texas
Night Vision division of Harris (previously from Exelis, itself a spinoff from ITT) in Roanoke, Virginia was purchased by ESA on September 15, 2019

South America
Brazil – In 2001, Aeroeletronica (AEL), a Brazilian company that had more than two decades of experience in the defense industry has become a part of the Elbit Systems Group. In January 2011, Elbit announced that it had bought two more Brazilian companies: Ares Aeroespecial e Defesa, and Periscopio Equipamentos Optronicos. In April 2011, Embraer has entered into a strategic agreement with AEL Sistemas S.A ("AEL"), a wholly owned subsidiary of Elbit Systems. The two companies were yet to define the specific programs to be pursued but, according to officials from the two companies, the main goals of the cooperation were the expanding of joint activities in the area of unmanned aircraft systems, including the anticipated creation of a jointly owned company, with majority participation of Embraer D&S. One of the primary goals of the joint venture will be to promote the introduction and use of Elbit Systems Hermes 450 UAV in the service of the Brazilian Air Force.

Colombia – In March 2010, a $28 million contract for Hermes 450 UAVs was suspended by the Colombian government after media reports based on anonymous letters alleged that Colombian officials had been bribed. The Israeli Ministry of Defense investigated and found that the letters likely came from Israel Aerospace Industries, a competitor that lost the tender. The incident led to a review of the regulations governing overseas competition between Israeli defense companies.

Southeast Asia
Philippines – Elbit won its first contract in the Philippines for the supply of upgraded armored personnel carriers to the Philippine military back in June 2014. The upgrade included 25mm unmanned turrets, 12.7 mm remote controlled weapon stations (RCWS) and fire control systems (FCS) for 90 mm turrets. The contract marks a significant breakthrough for Elbit Systems, as it is the first one awarded to the company in the Philippines. In 2015, the Armed Forces of the Philippines received 114 M113 tracked APCs from the United States. The improved version of M113A2 APCs will have Remote Control Weapons System (RWS) designed by Elbit Systems. The electronically driven turrets can be configured with various types of cannons (25mm/30mm), coaxial machine guns (7.62mm) and guided anti-tank missiles.

In August 2020, the Philippine Air Force received full delivery of three Hermes 900 and one Hermes 450 unmanned aerial systems (UAS) as part of a contract worth approximately $175 million. Each system consists of three unmanned aerial vehicles (UAVs), a ground control system and support equipment. Elbit Systems also included a spare used Hermes 450 UAV as part of the deal, for a total of 9 Hermes 900 UAVs and 4 Hermes 450 UAVs.

On October 23, 2020, amid the COVID-19 pandemic, Elbit won contracts to produce 18 Sabrah ASCOD Light Tanks and 10 Pandur II Tank Destroyers along with 1 ASCOD  2 Armored Command Vehicle, 1 ASCOD 2 Armored Recovery Vehicle and a separate another contract to supply 28 Iveco VBTP-MR Guarani APCs for the Philippine Army's Light Tank and APC Acquisition Projects.

Spyware 
On 6 December 2017, Citizenlab published a detailed report that showed that Ethiopian dissidents and journalists in the US, UK, and other countries were targeted by sophisticated commercial spyware, sold and operated by Cyberbit, a wholly owned subsidiary of Elbit Systems. In a reply to an inquiry from Human Rights Watch on the topic, Cyberbit did not deny selling this kind of technology, and rejected the responsibility of its possible misuse on its customers.

Divestment
On September 3, 2009, the Norwegian Pension Fund's ethical council decided to sell the fund's stocks in Elbit due to the corporations supply of surveillance systems for the Israeli West Bank barrier. At a press conference to announce the decision, Minister of Finance Kristin Halvorsen said "We do not wish to fund companies that so directly contribute to violations of international humanitarian law". The Norwegian Ambassador to Israel was called to a meeting at the Israeli Foreign Ministry where the decision was protested.

In January 2010, Danske Bank added Elbit to the list of companies that fail its Socially Responsible Investment policy; a bank spokesman noted that it was acting in the interests of its customers by not 'placing their money in companies that violate international standards'. The Danish financial watchdog Danwatch has also placed Elbit on its ethical blacklist, and one of Denmark's largest pension fund administrators PKA Ltd announced it will no longer consider investing in Elbit, stating "The ICJ stated that the barrier only serves military purposes and violates Palestinian human rights. Therefore we have looked at whether companies produce custom-designed products to the wall and thus has a particular involvement in repressive activities."

In March 2010, a Swedish pension fund not wanting to be associated with companies which in its opinion are violating international treaties, boycotted Elbit Systems for being involved in constructing the Israeli West Bank barrier.

HSBC divested from Elbit following its acquisition of IMI Systems. HSBC cited IMI's manufacturing of cluster bombs, which violated the bank's defense policy to not invest in companies linked to the manufacturing or marketing of cluster munition.

In April 2019, the publication of a report entitled AXA: Financing War Crimes by SumOfUs highlighted that AXA's investment subsidiary, AXA Investment Managers, a French investment firm, divested from Elbit on December 31, 2018.  However, the same study notes that their affiliate AXA Equitable Holdings maintains investment in the company.

Products

Unmanned aerial vehicles
 Elbit Hermes 90
 Elbit Hermes 450
 Elbit Hermes 900
 Elbit Skylark
 Silver Arrow Micro-V
 Silver Arrow Sniper

Unmanned surface vehicles
 Silver Marlin

Communication
 E-LynX

See also
Rafael Advanced Defense Systems
Elta Systems
Economy of Israel
Science and technology in Israel

References

External links
 Elbit Systems Limited web site
 Elbit Systems of America web site
 Elbit Systems Pilot Training Center

Avionics companies
Companies listed on the Tel Aviv Stock Exchange
Companies listed on the Nasdaq
Defense companies of Israel
Companies based in Haifa